Romario Kortzorg (born 25 August 1989 in Rotterdam) is a Dutch footballer who plays as a forward for Vietnamese club Nam Định. His name is Romario because his father was a fan of the Brazilian International footballer Romário.

On 30 April 2013, Kortzorg agreed a deal to sign for Botev Plovdiv for an undisclosed fee. In July 2014 he joined German club Erzgebirge Aue.

Personal life
Born in the Netherlands, Kortzorg is of Surinamese descent.

Honours

Club
ASA Târgu Mureș
Romanian Supercup: 2015

References

External links

1989 births
Living people
Footballers from Rotterdam
Dutch footballers
Dutch sportspeople of Surinamese descent
AGOVV Apeldoorn players
FC Dordrecht players
Botev Plovdiv players
ASA 2013 Târgu Mureș players
FC Dinamo București players
FC Astra Giurgiu players
CS Concordia Chiajna players
Eerste Divisie players
First Professional Football League (Bulgaria) players
2. Bundesliga players
Liga I players
Dutch expatriate footballers
Expatriate footballers in Bulgaria
Expatriate footballers in Germany
Expatriate footballers in Romania
Association football forwards